Softball at the 2018 Asian Games was held at the Gelora Bung Karno Softball Field in Jakarta, Indonesia, from 19 to 24 August 2018. The only event held was the women's softball.

Schedule

Medalists

Squads

Results
All times are Western Indonesia Time (UTC+07:00)

Preliminary round

Final round

Semifinals

Final

Grand final

Final standing

References

External links
Official Result Book – Softball

 
2018 Asian Games events
2018
Asian Games